Andricus gigas, also known as the saucer gall wasp, is a species of gall-forming wasp in the genus Andricus. It induces galls on the leaves of scrub oaks, blue oaks, and Engelmann oaks. The galls produced by its all-female generation, which emerges in winter, are 3-4 mm wide, circular with raised edges. They are red, pink, brown, or purple. The larval chamber exists as a raised bump in the gall's center. The bisexual generation produces galls that are brown and cone-shaped.

References

External links 
 Andricus gigas on gallformers

Cynipidae
Gall-inducing insects
Oak galls
Insects described in 1922